Jhony Douglas Santiago (born 19 February 1997), known as Jhony Douglas is a Brazilian footballer who plays as a defensive midfielder for São Bernardo FC.

Career statistics

References

External links

1997 births
Living people
Brazilian footballers
Association football midfielders
Campeonato Brasileiro Série A players
Campeonato Brasileiro Série B players
Campeonato Brasileiro Série C players
Paraná Clube players
Paysandu Sport Club players
Coritiba Foot Ball Club players
Associação Atlética Internacional (Limeira) players